Pannotia (from Greek: pan-, "all", -nótos, "south"; meaning "all southern land"), also known as the Vendian supercontinent, Greater Gondwana, and the Pan-African supercontinent, was a relatively short-lived Neoproterozoic supercontinent that formed at the end of the Precambrian during the Pan-African orogeny (650–500 Ma), during the Cryogenian period and broke apart 560 Ma with the opening of the Iapetus Ocean, in the late Ediacaran and early Cambrian.
Pannotia formed when Laurentia was located adjacent to the two major South American cratons, Amazonia and Río de la Plata.  The opening of the Iapetus Ocean separated Laurentia from Baltica, Amazonia, and Río de la Plata. In 2022 the whole concept of Pannotia has been put into question by scientists who argue its existence is not supported by geochronology, "the supposed landmass had begun to break up well before it was fully assembled".

Origin of concept
J. D. A. Piper was probably the first to propose a Proterozoic supercontinent preceding Pangaea, today known as Rodinia.  At that time he simply referred to it as "the Proterozoic super-continent", but much later he named this "symmetrical crescent-shaped analogue of Pangaea" 'Palaeopangaea' and in 2000 he still insisted that there is neither a need nor any evidences for Rodinia or its daughter supercontinent Pannotia or a series of other proposed supercontinents since Archaean times.

This term recognizes that the supercontinent of Gondwana, which formed at the end of the Neoproterozoic, was once part of the much larger end-Neoproterozoic supercontinent.

Powell, however, objected to this renaming and instead proposed Stump's term for the latter supercontinent.

Formation

The formation of Pannotia began during the Pan-African orogeny when the Congo continent got caught between the northern and southern halves of the previous supercontinent Rodinia some 750 Ma.  The peak in this mountain building event was around 640–610 Ma, but these continental collisions may have continued into the Early Cambrian some 530 Ma.  The formation of Pannotia was the result of Rodinia turning itself inside out.

When Pannotia had formed, Africa was located at the centre surrounded by the rest of Gondwana: South America, Arabia, Madagascar, India, Antarctica, and Australia.  Laurentia, which 'escaped' out of Rodinia, Baltica, and Siberia kept the relative positions they had in Rodinia.  The Cathaysian and Cimmerian terranes (continental blocks of southern Asia) were located along the northern margins of east Gondwana.  The Avalonian-Cadomian terranes (later to become central Europe, Britain, the North American east coast, and Yucatán) were located along the active northern margins of western Gondwana.  This orogeny probably extended north into the Uralian margin of Baltica.

Pannotia formed by subduction of exterior oceans (a mechanism called extroversion) over a geoid low, whereas Pangaea formed by subduction of interior oceans (introversion) over a geoid high perhaps caused by superplumes and slab avalanche events.
The oceanic crust subducted by Pannotia formed within the Mirovoi superocean that surrounded Rodinia before its 830–750 Ma break-up and were accreted during the Late Proterozoic orogenies that resulted from the assembly of Pannotia.

One of the major of these orogenies was the collision between East and West Gondwana or the East African Orogeny.  The Trans-Saharan Belt in West Africa is the result of the collision between the East Saharan Shield and the West African Craton when 1200–710 Ma-old volcanic and arc-related rocks were accreted to the margin of this craton.
600–500 Ma two Brazilian interior orogenies got highly deformed and metamorphosed between a series of colliding cratons: Amazonia, West Africa-São Luís, and São Francisco-Congo-Kasai.  The material that was accreted included 950–850 Ma mafic meta-igneous complexes and younger arc-related rocks.

Break-up

The break-up of Pannotia was accompanied by sea level rise, dramatic changes in climate and ocean water chemistry, and rapid metazoan diversification.

 found Neoproterozoic passive margin sequences worldwide – the first indication of a Late Neoproterozoic supercontinent but also the traces of its demise.

The Iapetus Ocean started to open while Pannotia was being assembled, 200 Ma after the break-up of Rodinia.  This opening of the Iapetus and other Cambrian seas coincided with the first steps in the evolution of soft-bodied metazoans, and also made a myriad of habitats available for them; this led to the so-called Cambrian explosion, the rapid evolution of skeletalized metazoans.

Trilobites originated in the Neoproterozoic and began to diversify before the break-up of Pannotia 600–550 Ma, as evidenced by their ubiquitous presence in the fossil record, and the lack of vicariance patterns in their lineage.

See also
 Plate tectonics
 Supercontinent cycle
 Pan-African orogeny

References

Notes

Sources

External links
 An image showing Pannotia according to Christopher Scotese. (it is referred to as the late Precambrian Supercontinent in the image).
 
  (see Fig. 3 for an Early Ordovician (490 Ma) reconstruction)

Former supercontinents
Ediacaran
Plate tectonics
Proterozoic